Sangeeta Yadav is an Indian politician and a member of 17th Legislative Assembly of Uttar Pradesh of India. She represents the Chauri-Chaura (Assembly constituency) in Gorakhpur district of Uttar Pradesh and is a member of the Bharatiya Janata Party.

Early life and education
Yadav was born 20 July 1981 in Borivali, Mumbai of Maharashtra to her father Shri R P Yadav. In 2009, she married Ajay Kumar (Maurya) (Addl.Commissioner of Income Tax). She belongs to (Yadav) community. She got Bachelor of Laws degree from MMH College, Ghaziabad in 2004.

Political career
Yadav started her journey in politics in 17th Legislative Assembly of Uttar Pradesh (2017) elections, she got ticket by Bharatiya Janata Party from Chauri-Chaura (Assembly constituency). She got elected as MLA by defeating Samajwadi Party candidate Manoranjan Yadav by a margin of 45,660 votes.

Posts held

References

Uttar Pradesh MLAs 2017–2022
Bharatiya Janata Party politicians from Uttar Pradesh
Living people
People from Gorakhpur district
1981 births